Great Blakenham Pit is a  geological Site of Special Scientific Interest south of Great Blakenham in Suffolk. It is a Geological Conservation Review site.

This is described by Natural England as a key site for Pleistocene studies. It has a sequence of early and middle Pleistocene deposits, including from the ancient course of the River Thames through East Anglia and from the severe Anglian ice age.

The site is private property with no public access.

References

Sites of Special Scientific Interest in Suffolk
Geological Conservation Review sites